Kansas Bible Company is a band from Goshen, Indiana based in Nashville, Tennessee.  The band's name was derived from the 1973 film Paper Moon.

History

The band began in 2008 at Goshen College, where all members attended. After a year-long hiatus the band got back together in 2010, releasing their first album Ad Astra Per Aspera before moving to Nashville. In November 2012, the band released its second full-length album Hotel Chicamauga.

In April 2013, the band released an 8-bit video game to promote the single "Jesus, The Horse Thief" from Hotel Chicamauga.

Discography

Ad Astra Per Aspera (Self-Released, 2011)
Surf Rock Trilogy EP (Self-Released, 2011)
Hotel Chicamauga (Self-Released, 2012)
Dads Day (Self-Released, 2014)
Paper Moon (Self-Released, 2016)
Saturn's Return (Self-Released, 2021)

References

External links 

 

Rock music groups from Indiana
Rock music groups from Tennessee
Musical groups from Nashville, Tennessee
Musical groups established in 2008